Mehmet Ali Şahin (born 16 September 1950) is a Turkish politician. He was the Speaker of the Parliament of Turkey from 2009 to 2011.

He was a member of the parliament for three terms from Istanbul Province and from Antalya Province of the ruling Justice and Development Party (AK Party). He served as Deputy Prime Minister, Minister of Justice, and as Minister of State responsible for sports.

Şahin is a lawyer and a graduate of Istanbul University faculty of law. Before entering parliament, he was involved in regional politics, serving as the mayor of Fatih district in Istanbul, with the Welfare Party, and later with Recep Tayyip Erdoğan's Justice and Development Party.

On 5 August 2009, he was elected in a third round of voting as the 24th (27th, from the establishment) Speaker of the Turkish Grand National Assembly, succeeding his party colleague Köksal Toptan. He was supportive of a solution to the Kurdish Turkish conflict, and dismissed the concerns of Turkish nationalists which argue that if Kurds receive more rights it would divide the country. In 2016, he also suggested the release of the imprisoned members of Parliament from the Peoples' Democracy Party (HDP) comparing their situation to the one of Mehmet Haberal, a lawmaker of the Republican People's Party (CHP) who was elected while imprisoned.

References

External links

Mehmet Ali Şahin (TBMM.org.tr) 

|-

|-

1950 births
Deputies of Antalya
Deputies of Istanbul
Deputies of Karabük
Deputy Prime Ministers of Turkey
Government ministers of Turkey
Istanbul University Faculty of Law alumni
Justice and Development Party (Turkey) politicians
Living people
Ministers of Justice of Turkey
Ministers of Youth and Sports of Turkey
People from Ovacık, Karabük
Speakers of the Parliament of Turkey
20th-century Turkish lawyers
Members of the 24th Parliament of Turkey
Members of the 23rd Parliament of Turkey
Members of the 22nd Parliament of Turkey
Members of the 21st Parliament of Turkey
Members of the 20th Parliament of Turkey
Members of the 26th Parliament of Turkey
Members of the 60th government of Turkey